Performance Analyzer is a commercial utility software for software performance analysis for x86 or SPARC machines. It has both a graphical user interface and a command line interface. It is available for both Linux and Solaris operating systems. It can profile C, C++ and Java.

Performance Analyzer is available as part of Oracle Developer Studio. It has visualization capabilities, can read out hardware performance counters, thread synchronization, memory allocations and I/O, and specifically supports Java, OpenMP, MPI, and the Solaris kernel.

See also
List of performance analysis tools
Performance analysis
VTune

References

Sun Microsystems software
Profilers